The 2016–17 Saint Peter's Peacocks men's basketball team represented Saint Peter's University during the 2016–17 NCAA Division I men's basketball season. The Peacocks, led by 11th-year head coach John Dunne, played their home games at the Yanitelli Center in Jersey City, New Jersey as members of the Metro Atlantic Athletic Conference. They finished the season 23–13, 14–6 in MAAC play to finish in second place. They defeated Canisius in the MAAC tournament before losing in the semifinals to Iona. They were invited to the CollegeInsider.com Tournament where they defeated Albany, Texas State, Furman and Texas A&M–Corpus Christi to become CIT champions.

Previous season
The Peacocks finished the 2015–16 season 14–16, 12–8 in MAAC play to finish in a tie for fourth place. They lost in the quarterfinals of the MAAC tournament to Fairfield.

Roster

Schedule and results

|-
!colspan=9 style=| Regular season

  
|-
!colspan=9 style=| MAAC tournament

|-
!colspan=9 style=| CIT

References

Saint Peter's Peacocks men's basketball seasons
Saint Peter's
Saint Peter's
CollegeInsider.com Postseason Tournament championship seasons
Saint
Saint